Seeger is the surname of various people.

Etymology
Seeger is one of the variant forms of Seagar, a surname of Middle English origin based on the given name Segar, which was formed from Old English sæ ("sea") and gar ("spear").

Seeger family of musicians
Charles Seeger (1886–1979), American musicologist, composer, and teacher
(i) Constance Edson Seeger, violinist; first wife of Charles; three children
 Charles Seeger III, (1912–2002) astronomer
 John Seeger, (1914–2010), high school principal and co-founder of Camp Killooleet, a summer camp in Vermont
 Pete Seeger (1919–2014), one of the preeminent American folk and protest singers of the 20th century
() Toshi Seeger (1922–2013), filmmaker and environmental activist, wife of Pete Seeger; 4 children
 Daniel Seeger 
 Mika Seeger American ceramic artist; daughter of Pete and Toshi Seeger
 Tao Rodríguez-Seeger (b. 1972), a contemporary American folk musician; son of Mika
 Tinya Seeger 
(ii) Ruth Crawford Seeger (1901–1953), a modernist composer and an American folk music specialist; second wife of Charles; 4 children
 Mike Seeger (1933–2009), American folk musician and folklorist
 Chris Arley Seeger (born 1961), technologist, broadcast engineer, mixer-editor; married to Laura Vaccaro Seeger, a children's book author-illustrator
 Peggy Seeger (born 1935), American folk singer and songwriter; wife of Scottish folk singer Ewan MacColl and stepmother of singer Kirsty MacColl
 Neil MacColl, guitarist for David Gray; son of Peggy Seeger and Ewan MacColl
Jamie MacColl, guitarist in Bombay Bicycle Club and Neil MacColl's son
 Barbara Seeger, appeared on Animal Folk Songs for Children (1992) with Mike Seeger and others
 Penny Seeger, married John Cohen
 Alan Seeger (1888–1916), American poet; brother of Charles
 Elizabeth Seeger (1889–1973), teacher at Dalton School and author; sister of Charles and Alan

Others
 Christopher A. Seeger (b. 1960), American attorney
 Al Seeger (b. 1980), American boxer
 Andreas Seeger, German mathematician
 Britta Seeger (b. 1969), German business executive
 Charles M. Seeger (b. 1948), American author and attorney
 Daniel Seeger (b. 1934), defendant in a case on conscription of pacifists
 Hal Seeger (1917–2005), an animated cartoon producer and director
 Louis Seeger (1798–1865), a German equestrian
 Melanie Seeger (b. 1977), German race walker
 Stanley J. Seeger (1930–2011), American art collector

Legal cases
"Seeger" may also reference either of two legal cases involving the individuals below:
 United States v. Seeger, regarding Daniel Seeger's conscription
 Seeger v. United States, regarding Pete Seeger's refusal to testify in front of the HUAC

Schools
 Seeger Memorial Junior-Senior High School in West Lebanon, Indiana
 Elizabeth Seeger School in Greenwich Village, established in 1971 by five teachers from Dalton School

See also 

 Seger
 Seager
Segger (surname)

Object names
 Seeger ring, alternative name for a circlip
 The closest modern named object that corresponds to a seaspear is a Harpoon.

References